Adam Richard Sandler (born September 9, 1966) is an American comedian, actor, screenwriter, producer, singer, and musician. Known primarily as a comedic leading actor in film and television, he has received various accolades, including nominations for three Grammy Awards, five Primetime Emmy Awards, a Golden Globe Award, and a Screen Actors Guild Award.

Sandler was a cast member on the NBC sketch comedy series Saturday Night Live from 1990 to 1995. He then went on to star in numerous Hollywood films, cumulatively grossing over $2 billion at the worldwide box office. Sandler had an estimated net worth of $420 million in 2020, and signed a further four-movie deal with Netflix worth over $250 million.

Sandler's comedic roles include Billy Madison (1995), Happy Gilmore (1996), The Waterboy (1998), The Wedding Singer (1998), Big Daddy (1999), Mr. Deeds (2002), 50 First Dates (2004), The Longest Yard (2005), Click (2006), Grown Ups (2010), Just Go with It (2011), Grown Ups 2 (2013), Blended (2014), Murder Mystery (2019) and Hubie Halloween (2020). He also voiced Davey, Whitey, and Eleanore in Eight Crazy Nights (2002) and Dracula in the first three films of the Hotel Transylvania franchise (2012–2018).

Some of Sandler's comedies, such as Jack and Jill (2011), have been panned, resulting in nine Golden Raspberry Awards and 37 Raspberry Award nominations, more than any actor except Sylvester Stallone. However, Sandler has also received acclaim for his leading roles in comedy-drama films including Paul Thomas Anderson's Punch-Drunk Love (2002), Mike Binder's Reign Over Me (2007), Noah Baumbach's The Meyerowitz Stories (2017), the Safdie brothers' Uncut Gems (2019), and Jeremiah Zagar's Hustle (2022), with the latter three ranked as major career highlights.

Early life 
Sandler was born in Brooklyn, New York, on September 9, 1966, to Judith "Judy" (née Levine), a nursery school teacher, and Stanley Sandler, an electrical engineer. His family is Jewish and descends from Russian-Jewish immigrants on both sides. Sandler grew up in Manchester, New Hampshire, after moving there at the age of six. He attended Manchester Central High School. As a teen, Sandler was in BBYO, a Jewish youth group. He graduated from New York University's Tisch School of the Arts in 1988.

Career

1987–1995: Early television and film roles

In 1987, Sandler played Theo Huxtable's friend Smitty on The Cosby Show and the Stud Boy or Trivia Delinquent on the MTV game show Remote Control. After his film debut in Going Overboard in 1989, Sandler performed in comedy clubs, having first taken the stage at his brother's urging when he was 17. He was discovered by comedian Dennis Miller, who caught Sandler's act in Los Angeles and recommended him to Saturday Night Live producer Lorne Michaels. Sandler was hired as a writer for SNL in 1990, and became a featured player the following year. He made a name for himself by performing amusing original songs on the show, including "The Thanksgiving Song" and "The Chanukah Song". Sandler told Conan O'Brien on The Tonight Show that NBC fired him and Chris Farley from the show in 1995. Sandler used his firing as part of his monologue when he returned in 2019 to host the show.

In 1993, Adam Sandler appeared in the film Coneheads with Farley, David Spade, Dan Aykroyd, Phil Hartman, and Jane Curtin. In 1994, he co-starred in Airheads with Brendan Fraser and Steve Buscemi.

1995–2007: Box office success and Happy Madison founding

Sandler starred in Billy Madison (1995) playing a grown man repeating grades 1–12 to earn back his father's respect and the right to inherit his father's multimillion-dollar hotel empire. The film was successful at the box office despite negative reviews. He followed this film with Bulletproof (1996), and the financially successful comedies Happy Gilmore (1996) and The Wedding Singer (1998). He was initially cast in the bachelor–party–themed comedy/thriller Very Bad Things (1998) but had to back out due to his involvement in The Waterboy (1998), one of his first hits.

Sandler formed his film production company, Happy Madison Productions, in 1999, first producing fellow SNL alumnus Rob Schneider's film Deuce Bigalow: Male Gigolo. The company has produced most of Sandler's subsequent films to date, and is on the Sony/Columbia Pictures lot in Culver City, California. Most of its films have received negative reviews from critics, with three considered among the worst ever made yet most have performed well at the box office.

Although his earlier commercially successful films did not receive favorable critical attention, Sandler started to receive more positive reviews beginning with Punch-Drunk Love in 2002. Punch-Drunk Love writer and director, Paul Thomas Anderson, had an "obsession-level" love for Sandler's previous movies and wrote the film with him in mind. Sandler was intimidated to work with Anderson upon viewing his previous film Magnolia (2000), but these fears were alleviated upon receiving the script from Anderson. Roger Ebert's review of Punch-Drunk Love concluded that Sandler had been wasted in earlier films with poorly written scripts and characters with no development. Ebert noted that Sandler's character still maintained the "childlike, love-starved" persona from his previous films, but was shown in a new light as the "key to all Adam Sandler films." Sandler was nominated for a Golden Globe Award for Best Actor – Motion Picture Musical or Comedy for his performance. The film marked the beginning of Sandler moving outside the genre of slapstick comedy to take on more serious roles, such as Mike Binder's Reign Over Me (2007), a drama about a man who loses his entire family in the September 11 attacks and then struggles to rekindle a friendship with his old college roommate (Don Cheadle).

2007–2016: Later success and final theatrical films

Sandler starred alongside friend Kevin James in the film I Now Pronounce You Chuck and Larry (2007), and headlined You Don't Mess with the Zohan (2008). The latter was written by Sandler, Judd Apatow, and Robert Smigel, and directed by Dennis Dugan. That same year, Sandler starred along with Keri Russell and English comedian Russell Brand in Adam Shankman's children's fantasy film Bedtime Stories (2008), as a stressed hotel maintenance worker whose bedtime stories he reads to his niece and nephew begin to come true. It marked Sandler's first family film and first film under the Disney banner.

In 2009, Sandler starred in Apatow's third directorial feature, Funny People, a comedy drama about a famous comedian (Sandler) with a terminal illness. The film was released on July 31, 2009. After its release, Funny People and Punch-Drunk Love were cited in the June 2010 announcement that Sandler was one of 135 people (including 20 actors) invited to join the Academy of Motion Picture Arts and Sciences.

In 2010, Sandler appeared in Grown Ups, alongside Kevin James, Chris Rock, Rob Schneider, and David Spade. Sandler and Dickie Roberts scribe Fred Wolf wrote the script and Dennis Dugan directed. Sandler's later comedy films, including Grown Ups and Grown Ups 2, received largely negative reviews. Reviewing the latter, critic Mark Olsen of the Los Angeles Times remarked that Sandler had become the antithesis of Judd Apatow; he was instead "the white Tyler Perry: smart enough to know better, savvy enough to do it anyway, lazy enough not to care." The next year, Sandler starred with Jennifer Aniston in the romantic comedy film Just Go with It. He also voiced a capuchin monkey in Kevin James's Zookeeper, released on July 8, 2011. In 2012, he starred in That's My Boy, as a man who fathered a son (Andy Samberg) with his teacher (Eva Amurri) in high school. In 2013, he guest starred in the Disney Channel Original Series Jessie as himself in the episode "Punched Dumped Love." He and Jessie star Cameron Boyce had worked together in Grown Ups and Grown Ups 2; Sandler's 2020 film Hubie Halloween was dedicated to Boyce's memory. Sandler next reunited with Drew Barrymore in the Warner Bros. romantic comedy Blended, which was filmed in South Africa and released on May 23, 2014.

In October 2014, Netflix announced a four-movie deal with Sandler and Happy Madison Productions. Also that year, Sandler co-starred in the drama film Men, Women & Children, directed by Jason Reitman. He was considered for the voice of Rocket Raccoon in Marvel's Guardians of the Galaxy but Bradley Cooper was cast instead.

In 2015, Sandler released his last theatrical film, Pixels, based on French director Patrick Jean's 2010 short film of the same name, before transitioning into a distribution deal with Netflix.

2016–present: Transition to Netflix 
Sandler's first original film for Netflix was the Western comedy film The Ridiculous 6. Despite being universally panned by critics, on January 6, 2016, it was announced by Netflix that the film had been viewed more times in 30 days than any other movie in Netflix history.<ref>{{cite web|url=https://variety.com/2016/film/news/adam-sandlers-ridiculous-six-is-making-history-for-netflix-1201673572|title=Adam Sandles 'Ridiculous Six' Is Making History for Netflix|work=Variety|first=Margaret|last=Lenker|date=January 6, 2016|access-date=February 10, 2022}}</ref> Sandler also starred in another Netflix film in 2016, titled The Do-Over.

Sandler starred in the 2017 Netflix film Sandy Wexler, in which he plays a talent manager who falls in love with one of his clients. He returned to dramatic territory in 2017 with Noah Baumbach's family drama The Meyerowitz Stories. In the film, Sandler plays Danny Meyerowitz, who is unemployed and separated from his wife. His experiencing dysfunctional relationships with his brother (Ben Stiller), his sister (Elizabeth Marvel), and his father (Dustin Hoffman). The film premiered in competition for the Palme d'Or at the 2017 Cannes Film Festival where his performance received favorable notices from critics. Peter Debruge, film critic for Variety wrote of his performance, "With no shtick to fall back on, Sandler is forced to act, and it's a glorious thing to watch".

In 2018, Sandler starred in the Netflix film The Week Of alongside Chris Rock. He also starred in a Netflix stand-up special 100% Fresh, which was part of his company's Netflix deal and marked his first stand-up film in over two decades. The special was directed by longtime collaborator Steven Brill, while portions of the special was filmed by Paul Thomas Anderson, which marked his first project with Sandler since Punch-Drunk Love sixteen years prior.

On May 4, 2019, Sandler made his first appearance as host of Saturday Night Live, ending the episode with a tribute to his friend and fellow former cast member Chris Farley. Sandler received a Primetime Emmy Award for Outstanding Guest Actor in a Comedy Series nomination for his hosting stint. In June 2019, he starred alongside Jennifer Aniston in the Netflix film Murder Mystery, which broke the record for the biggest opening weekend in the company's history.

In December 2019, Sandler starred in the crime thriller drama Uncut Gems, directed by the Safdie brothers. The movie and Sandler's acting received critical acclaim and many end-of-year awards from critics, who noted this role as a career best for Sandler, for which he earned the Independent Spirit Award for Best Male Lead.

In January 2020, Netflix announced a new four-movie deal with Happy Madison Productions worth up to $275 million. Sandler starred in and wrote the 2020 Netflix film Hubie Halloween.

Sandler produced and starred in the 2022 sports drama film Hustle, which received critical acclaim. His performance in the film was repeatedly singled out for praise and he received a nomination for a Screen Actors Guild Award.

Public image
Sandler has been referenced multiple times in various media, including in the TV shows The Simpsons, in the episode "Monty Can't Buy Me Love", in the Family Guy episode "Stew-Roids", and in the South Park episode "You're Getting Old". He was also referenced in the video game Half-Life: Opposing Force. The HBO series Animals episode "The Trial" features a mock court case to decide whether Sandler or Jim Carrey is a better comedian.

In 2021, Vogue named Sandler the year's fashion icon for popularizing a "grocery-run look", characterized by oversized t-shirts, XXL pants, and Nike sneakers dubbed as "Adam Sandler style". Menswear brand Old Jewish Men sells a line of basketball shorts inspired by the style. Speaking on the title with Esquire, Sandler remarked: "It took a while. I was working that angle for years. For a while I was like, 'Please accept me and the way I dress.' And 30 years later, they finally came around."

 Personal life 

Sandler has been married to Jacqueline "Jackie" Sandler (née Titone) since 2003. She converted to Sandler's religion, Judaism. The couple has two daughters, Sadie (born May 2006), and Sunny (born November 2008). Sandler's wife and children often appear in his films. Adam's nephew, Jared, has also been featured in his films, such as Pixels and Home Team.

In 2007, Sandler made a $1 million donation to the Boys & Girls Clubs of America in Manchester, New Hampshire.

Sandler has not publicly talked about his political positions. It has been publicly reported that he has been registered to vote as a Republican. He performed at the 2004 Republican National Convention, and he contributed $2,100 to Rudy Giuliani's 2008 presidential campaign (the maximum amount allowed at the time). 
FilmographyThis is a partial list of Sandler's film and television work. Discography 

Albums

"The Peeper" was made into a flash cartoon, launched over the 1999 Labor Day weekend as a promotion for Stan and Judy's Kid and was watched by over 1 million users during that period, one of the most-watched video clips on the internet at the time.

In 2009 Sandler contributed the Neil Young cover "Like a Hurricane" to Covered, A Revolution in Sound as part of Warner Brothers 50th Anniversary celebrations; the song was performed on the David Letterman Show'' with a band that included, among others, Waddy Wachtel, who has appeared with Sandler on a number of occasions.

Singles

References

External links 

 
 

 
1966 births
Living people
20th-century American comedians
20th-century American Jews
20th-century American male actors
21st-century American comedians
21st-century American Jews
21st-century American male actors
21st-century American male writers
Actors from Manchester, New Hampshire
American comedy musicians
American film producers
American male comedians
American male comedy actors
American male film actors
American male screenwriters
American male singers
American male television actors
American male television writers
American male voice actors
American people of Russian-Jewish descent
American sketch comedians
American stand-up comedians
American television writers
Comedians from New Hampshire
Comedians from New York City
Film producers from New York (state)
Independent Spirit Award for Best Male Lead winners
Jewish American comedians
Jewish American male actors
Jewish American musicians
Jewish American screenwriters
Jewish male comedians
Male actors from New Hampshire
Male actors from New York City
Manchester Central High School alumni
Mark Twain Prize recipients
Musicians from Brooklyn
New York (state) Republicans
Screenwriters from New Hampshire
Screenwriters from New York (state)
Singers from New Hampshire
Singers from New York City
Television producers from New York City
Tisch School of the Arts alumni
Writers from Brooklyn